Darcey Elizabeth Lemon Wilson  (born 5 February 2001) is an Australian actress who has been in Australian movies, television, and short films.  Some of her main roles are: Eloise Page in Home and Away, and Melly in Swinging Safari  (Flammable Children). She is the daughter of actress Genevieve Lemon.

Filmography

Film

Television

Short Film

References

External links

Australian child actresses
Living people
2001 births
21st-century Australian actresses
Australian film actresses
Australian television actresses